An evisceration is the removal of the eye's contents, leaving the scleral shell and extraocular muscles intact. The procedure is usually performed to reduce pain or improve cosmesis in a blind eye, as in cases of endophthalmitis unresponsive to antibiotics. An ocular prosthetic can be fitted over the eviscerated eye in order to improve cosmesis.

Either general or local anesthetics may be used during eviscerations, with antibiotics and anti-inflammatory agents injected intravenously.

See also
 Enucleation of the eye
 Eye surgery
 Oculoplastics

References

External links
 Surgical photos

Eye surgery